Sclerodermus is a genus of cuckoo wasps in the family Bethylidae. There are at least 20 described species in Sclerodermus.

Species
These 24 species belong to the genus Sclerodermus:

 Sclerodermus abdominalis Westwood, 1839 g
 Sclerodermus brevicornis Kieffer, 1906 g
 Sclerodermus cereicollis Kieffer, 1904 g
 Sclerodermus concinnus Saunders, 1881 g
 Sclerodermus cylindricus Westwood, 1839 g
 Sclerodermus domesticus Klug, 1809 g
 Sclerodermus ephippius Saunders, 1881 g
 Sclerodermus fasciatus Westwood, 1839 g
 Sclerodermus fonscolombei Westwood, 1881 g
 Sclerodermus formiciformis Westwood, 1839 g
 Sclerodermus fulvicornis Westwood, 1839 g
 Sclerodermus fuscicornis Westwood, 1839 g
 Sclerodermus fuscus (Nees, 1834) g
 Sclerodermus gracilis Saunders, 1881 g
 Sclerodermus intermedius Westwood, 1839 g
 Sclerodermus linearis Westwood, 1881 g
 Sclerodermus minutus Westwood, 1839 g
 Sclerodermus nipponicus Yuasa, 1930 g
 Sclerodermus nitidus Westwood, 1839 g
 Sclerodermus pedunculus Westwood, 1839 g
 Sclerodermus piceus Westwood, 1839 g
 Sclerodermus rufa (Foerster, 1850) g
 Sclerodermus rufescens (Nees, 1834) g
 Sclerodermus sidneyanus Westwood, 1874 g

Data sources: i = ITIS, c = Catalogue of Life, g = GBIF, b = Bugguide.net

References

Further reading

External links

 

Parasitic wasps
Chrysidoidea